Prix découvertes RFI is the French-speaking African version of the reality singing competition, RFI Discovery Prize, and was created in 1981 to highlight new musical talents from Africa each year. This show has featured artists such as Tiken Jah Fakoly, Mav Cacharel, Rokia Traoré, Didier Awadi, Amadou and Mariam, Canjo Amissi or Maurice Kirya.

Coaches and hosts 
The judging panel is made up of industry professionals, and is each year chaired by notable personalities such as Jacob Desvarieux, Youssou N'Dour, Angélique Kidjo, Passi, Kery James, Richard Bona, A'salfo, and Fally Ipupa. RFI and its partners offer the winner professional support, cross-channel promotion, and promotion on their websites. In addition, the winner receives 10,000 euros and a tour of Africa. They also perform a concert in Paris.

See also 

 Radio France Internationale
 The Voice Afrique Francophone

References 

French-language television shows
Television franchises